Rupert Wainwright is an English film and television director, with credits including Blank Check (1994), The Sadness of Sex (1995) and Stigmata (1999). He is also a music video producer and multiple award-winner.

British-born, Wainwright was one of the youngest directors accepted in the Discovery Program sponsored by Columbia Pictures. He established a reputation for making award-winning television advertisements (including Reebok) and music videos (most notably M.C. Hammer). 

Originally an actor, appearing in Another Country (1984) and Dreamchild (1985), Wainright later directed the ABC film Dillinger (1991) starring Mark Harmon. In 2005, he directed the supernatural horror film The Fog.

Music videos 

Wainwright attended UCLA on a Fulbright Scholarship where he started directing music videos. He most notably produced and directed multiple videos for M.C. Hammer (such as "U Can't Touch This"), which contributed to Hammer becoming a worldwide phenomenon. He has also worked with artists such as N.W.A and Michael Jackson, winning five MTV Video Music Awards, a Grammy Award (including two nominations) and many other awards.

Wainwright also directed Please Hammer Don't Hurt 'Em: The Movie, along with John Oetjen (video producer), winning a Grammy for Best Music Video, Long Form at the 33rd Grammy Awards.

References

External links
 
 

English music video directors
English film directors
Living people
Grammy Award winners
Year of birth missing (living people)